The 2023 season is the 40th season of Seattle Sounders FC, a professional soccer team based in Seattle, Washington, United States. It is their 15th in Major League Soccer (MLS), the top flight of American soccer. The team was under the management of Brian Schmetzer in his seventh full MLS season as head coach of the Sounders.

Background

Early in the 2022 season, the Sounders won the CONCACAF Champions League by defeating UNAM of Liga MX. They became the first Major League Soccer team to win the CONCACAF Champions League and third to win an international CONCACAF competition. The season ended with the team missing the MLS Cup Playoffs for the first time in the league, snapping a 13-year streak—among the longest in professional North American sports.

Summary

Following the end of the 2022 season, the Sounders exercised their contract options on most of their roster with the exception of forward Will Bruin and midfielder Alfonso Ocampo-Chavez; defender Jimmy Medranda and forward Fredy Montero were also released into free agency. In December, the club signed forward Héber from New York City FC. Seattle opened their training camp at Starfire Sports in Tukwila on January 4, 2023, and traveled later that month to Marbella, Spain, where they played friendlies against Wolfsberger AC of Austria and Hammarby IF of Sweden.

In addition to league play from February to October, the Sounders will also participate in several cup competitions. Their 2022 CONCACAF Champions League victory qualified them for the FIFA Club World Cup, which was by Morocco in early February. The Sounders lost 1–0 to Egypt's Al Ahly in the second round and were eliminated from the tournament. Seattle will enter the U.S. Open Cup in the third round, scheduled for April. In July and August, MLS play will halt for the Leagues Cup, an international competition with Liga MX clubs hosted in the United States and Canada. The club scheduled a doubleheader with women's team OL Reign, with whom they share Lumen Field, at an unspecified date.

The 2023 season is the first with jersey sponsor Providence Health & Services. It will also be the first under a streaming contract with Apple TV+, which will offer the MLS Season Pass service. Six Sounders matches will also be broadcast on U.S. television by Fox Sports.

Roster

Coaching staff

Transfers

For transfers in, dates listed are when Sounders FC officially signed the players to the roster. Transactions where only the rights to the players are acquired are not listed. For transfers out, dates listed are when Sounders FC officially removed the players from its roster, not when they signed with another club. If a player later signed with another club, his new club will be noted, but the date listed here remains the one when he was officially removed from Sounders FC roster.

In

Out

Non-competitive
Key

Preseason matches

Competitions

Key

FIFA Club World Cup

Major League Soccer

League tables

Western Conference

Overall

Results

Match results

The Major League Soccer schedule was released on December 20, 2022. The Sounders will play 34 matches—mostly against opponents from the Western Conference—during the regular season from February 25 to October 21.

U.S. Open Cup

The Sounders will enter the 2023 U.S. Open Cup in the third round as part of the lower tranche of MLS teams, as determined by their final position in the 2022 regular season. The third round is scheduled for April 18 and 19.

Leagues Cup

The 2023 Leagues Cup, an expanded version of the inter-league competition between MLS and Liga MX, is scheduled to begin on July 21. All MLS matches will be paused until the end of the tournament on August 19. The Sounders were drawn into the West 2 group alongside Real Salt Lake and Liga MX's Monterrey. MLS teams will play a minimum of two matches in the tournament, of which they will host at least one.

Standings

References

Seattle Sounders FC seasons
Seattle Sounders
Seattle
Seattle
Seattle Sounders